Dario Cedeño (born August 20, 1991 in Chone) is an Ecuadorian football defender currently playing for Barcelona.

See also
Football in Ecuador

References

External links
FEF Player card

Ecuadorian footballers
1991 births
Living people
Barcelona S.C. footballers
Association football defenders